Stéphane Houdet and Nicolas Peifer defeated the defending champion Gordon Reid and his partner Alfie Hewett in the final, 6–4, 6–2 to win the men's doubles wheelchair tennis title at the 2018 Australian Open.

Joachim Gérard and Reid were the defending champions, but Gérard did not participate.

Seeds

Draw

Draw

External links
 Main Draw

Wheelchair Men's Doubles
2018 Men's Doubles